Horné Naštice is a village and municipality in Bánovce nad Bebravou District in the Trenčín Region of north-western Slovakia.

History
In historical records the village was first mentioned in 1295.

Geography
The municipality lies at an altitude of 237 metres and covers an area of 8.565 km².

Population
On 31 December 2011, it had a population of 408 people.

See also
 List of municipalities and towns in Slovakia

References

Genealogical resources

The records for genealogical research are available at the state archive "Statny Archiv in Nitra,, Slovakia"

 Roman Catholic church records (births/marriages/deaths): 1700-1895 (parish B)
 Lutheran church records (births/marriages/deaths): 1732-1919 (parish B)

External links
  Official page
https://web.archive.org/web/20070513023228/http://www.statistics.sk/mosmis/eng/run.html
Surnames of living people in Horne Nastice

Villages and municipalities in Bánovce nad Bebravou District